The Philippine Senate Committee on Social Justice, Welfare and Rural Development is a standing committee of the Senate of the Philippines.

Jurisdiction 
According to the Rules of the Senate, the committee handles all matters relating to:

 Rural development and welfare
 The Constitution on Social Justice

Members, 18th Congress 
Based on the Rules of the Senate, the Senate Committee on Social Justice, Welfare and Rural Development has 7 members.

The President Pro Tempore, the Majority Floor Leader, and the Minority Floor Leader are ex officio members.

Here are the members of the committee in the 18th Congress as of September 24, 2020:

1 De Lima is a member of the Senate minority.

Committee secretary: Gemma Genoveva G. Tanpiengco

See also 

 List of Philippine Senate committees

References 

Social